The 1991 Montana Grizzlies football team was an American football team that represented the University of Montana in the Big Sky Conference during the 1991 NCAA Division I-AA football season. In their sixth year under head coach Don Read, the team compiled a 7–4 record.

Schedule

References

Montana
Montana Grizzlies football seasons
Montana Grizzlies football